WSAA (93.1 FM) is a radio station broadcasting a Christian worship format from Air 1. Licensed to Benton, Tennessee, United States, the station serves the Cleveland, Tennessee area.  The station is owned by WSAA, LLC.

History
The station was assigned the call sign WBIN-FM on July 3, 1992; it signed on in November 1996 with an adult contemporary format. In April 1998, WBIN-FM dropped a contemporary Christian format and began simulcasting a southern gospel format with WBIN (1540 AM); on May 18, 1998, the station changed its call sign to WOCE, ahead of a change to adult contemporary that July.

In September 2000, the adult contemporary format moved to WCLE-FM (104.1); WOCE then changed to a ranchera format from Jones Radio Network. By February 2001, the station was carrying programming from the Z-Spanish Network, switching from its Spanish-language hits programming to regional Mexican. On April 3, 2006, the call sign was changed to WSAA. Following a silent period, the station returned to the air with a country music format, "Ocoee 93", on September 2, 2008.

WSAA carried an adult hits format under the "Jack FM" beginning in May 2009, after WPLZ (95.3 FM) switched from "Jack FM" to a news/talk format. On September 6, 2011, WSAA changed its format to EMF's Air 1 Christian rock format; the "Jack FM" format moved to WQMT (93.9 FM).

References

External links

Air1 radio stations
Radio stations established in 1997
1997 establishments in Tennessee
Mass media in Bradley County, Tennessee
Polk County, Tennessee
SAA